The New Godfathers is a 1979 Italian poliziottesco film directed by Alfonso Brescia.

Plot

A great quantity of drug travels undercovered from Iran and Turkey and arrives in port of Naples. An Italian Guardia di Finanza officer tries to intercept the stuff and achieves the collaboration of Don Francesco Autiero, the chief of illegal cigarettes trade in Naples.

Cast 
Mario Merola: Don Francesco Autiero
Antonio Sabàto: Don Michele Vizzini
Gianni Garko: Captain Ivano Radevic
Jeff Blynn: Salvatore Gargiulo
Lorraine De Selle: Lorraine
Edmund Purdom: Head of the International Commission on Narcotic Drugs
Lucio Montanaro: Cassio Petrorio
Rick Battaglia: Don Calogero Avallone
Letizia D'Adderio: Stellatella
Marco Girondino: Gennarino
Nunzio Gallo: Dr. Martinelli
Hassan Jaber: Vito
Franco Diogene: Achmet
Sabrina Siani: Lucy Avallone

Production
The film was intended for the foreign market, unlike most other films in the subgenre.

Cior Ippolito's autobiography mentions that the film was made to help P.A.C.'s head Mario Bregni's recover costs that The Sicilian Connection which had lost a lot of money for the company.

Ippolito suggested the idea of using the action scenes from the film and apply them to a new film as not many people had seen the previous film. Ippolito stated that he had shot the new film in two weeks.

Release
The New Godfathers was released in Italy on August 25, 1979 where it was distributed by P.A.C. The film grossed a total of 342 million Italian lire on its theatrical release.

References

Footnotes

Sources

External links
 

1979 films
1970s Italian-language films
1979 crime films
Films directed by Alfonso Brescia
Poliziotteschi films
Films set in Naples
Films about the Camorra
1970s Italian films